Jawad El Hajri (born 1 November 1979), also known as Jaouad El Hajri, is a retired footballer. In 2006, he won one cap for the Morocco national football team in a friendly against Burkina Faso.

References

Jawad El Hajri profile at foot-national.com

1979 births
Living people
People from Bergerac, Dordogne
Sportspeople from Dordogne
Association football forwards
Moroccan footballers
Morocco international footballers
Ligue 2 players
UAE First Division League players
Pacy Ménilles RC players
Olympique Alès players
En Avant Guingamp players
AS Cherbourg Football players
US Boulogne players
Stade Brestois 29 players
Baniyas Club players
Dubai CSC players
Dibba FC players
AS Moulins players
Paris FC players
Moulins Yzeure Foot players
Footballers from Nouvelle-Aquitaine